Drozda is a surname. Notable people with the surname include:

 Petr Drozda (born 1952), Czech wrestler
 Thomas Drozda (born 1965), Austrian politician

See also
 Drozd (surname)